William Rex Austin  (23 May 1931 – 23 June 2022) was a New Zealand politician of the National Party.

Biography

Austin was born in Riverton, Southland, in 1931. Of Māori descent, he affiliated to Ngāi Tahu, Waitaha and Kāti Māmoe. He received his education at Southland Technical College and Lincoln College; at the latter institution, he obtained a diploma in agriculture. In 1958, he married Miriam Helen Brumpton, with whom he had four sons.

Austin farmed at Colac Bay in Southland and lived in Riverton. From 1971, he was a member of the Southland Hospital Board.

In the 1975 election he was elected to Parliament as the National Party MP for Awarua, which he represented until 1987.

Austin and Ben Couch were the second and third Māori (after Sir James Carroll) to win a general electorate, as opposed to one of the Māori electorates.

Austin died in Invercargill on 23 June 2022, at the age of 91.

Honours
In 1977, Austin was awarded the Queen Elizabeth II Silver Jubilee Medal, and in 1990 the New Zealand 1990 Commemoration Medal. In the 1994 New Year Honours, he was appointed a Member of the Order of the British Empire, for services to the community.

References

1931 births
2022 deaths
New Zealand National Party MPs
Māori MPs
Ngāi Tahu people
New Zealand Members of the Order of the British Empire
New Zealand MPs for South Island electorates
Members of the New Zealand House of Representatives
People from Riverton, New Zealand
Lincoln University (New Zealand) alumni
People educated at Aurora College (Invercargill)
Kāti Māmoe people
Waitaha (South Island iwi)